"Otherside" is a song by American rock band Red Hot Chili Peppers. It was released as the third single from their seventh studio album, Californication (1999), and confronts the battles addicts have with their prior addictions. The track was released in Australia and New Zealand in 1999 and was given an international release in January of the following year.

The single was highly successful, peaking at number 14 on the US Billboard Hot 100, the fourth-highest peak for the band, and number one on the Billboard Alternative Songs chart, which was, at the time, the fifth for the band. The song remained at number one on this chart for 13 consecutive weeks, one of the longest runs at the top of that chart. It was also a big success in Iceland, where it became the second single from the album to reach number one, and in New Zealand, where it charted at number five.

"Otherside" refers to former band member Hillel Slovak, who died of a heroin overdose in 1988.

Music video
The video was directed by Jonathan Dayton and Valerie Faris in a black-and-white/monochrome Gothic style similar to Robert Wiene's The Cabinet of Dr. Caligari, all influenced by German Expressionist art. Elements of Cubism and work by the graphic artist M. C. Escher are also seen in the video.

A cartoonish story line is juxtaposed upon the song; that of a young man's dream sequence. The band members appear dressed in black in unusual locations, with props intended to appear as surreal instruments. Throughout the video Anthony Kiedis with short, platinum hair is seen in a castle tower. His stage persona is different and quite dark when compared to his more energetic performances in other videos. John Frusciante plays a rope down a long corridor as if a guitar. Flea is hanging on high voltage wires and playing them as if they were a bass guitar, and Chad Smith is up on a tower with a rotating medieval clock that serves as his drum kit.

Jonathan Dayton: "We did look at Caligari, and we looked at a lot of German Expressionist film. But it was also very important to avoid 'Caligari.' It was both inspiration and something to work around, because it has such a strong, specific style, and there have been other videos that have completely ripped it off."

Valerie Faris: "We didn't look at 'Calagari' all that much, really. We did, but then we just left it. We did look at a lot of the works of the futurist artists from the '30s, and the illustrations of the surrealists and from cubism. We were inspired more by paintings than by films…"

Live performances
"Otherside" has remained a constant staple on the band's tours since 1999, making it one of their top ten most performed songs.

Remixes

In 2009, Seattle producer Ryan Lewis sampled the song as a backdrop for his song of the same name with the rapper Macklemore. The song depicted Macklemore's own personal struggles as well as the wider problems that the hip hop community has with drug abuse.

In 2010, house duo Third Party made an unofficial remix of the song. The remix garnered considerable attention, but was never released. It was made official and released by Warner Records in 2013.

In 2015 British DJ Paul Oakenfold released a Future House remix released also by Warner Records, another version was released by Italian DJ Benny Benassi alongside Oakenfold.

Track listings

CD single (2000)
 "Otherside" (album) – 4:16
 "How Strong" (previously unreleased)– 4:43

CD version 2 (2000)
 "Otherside" (album) – 4:16
 "My Lovely Man" (live) – 5:18
 "Around the World" (music video)

CD version 3 [Australian release] (2000)
 "Otherside" (album) – 4:16
 "How Strong" (previously unreleased) – 4:46
 "My Lovely Man" (live) – 5:18
 "Road Trippin'" (without strings) – 3:25
 "Scar Tissue" (music video)
 "Around the World" (music video)

CD version 4 (2000)
 "Otherside" (album) – 4:16
 "How Strong" (previously unreleased) – 4:43
 "My Lovely Man" (live) – 5:18
 "Road Trippin'" (without strings) – 3:25

CD version 5 (2000)
 "Otherside" (album) – 4:16
 "How Strong" (previously unreleased) – 4:43
 "Road Trippin'" (without strings) – 3:25
 "Otherside" (music video)

Cassette version [US] (1999)
 "Otherside" (album) - 4:16
 "How Strong" (previously unreleased) – 4:43

PersonnelRed Hot Chili Peppers'''
 Anthony Kiedis – lead vocals
 John Frusciante – guitar, backing vocals
 Flea – bass
 Chad Smith – drums, shaker, cowbell

Charts

Weekly charts

Year-end charts

Certifications

Release history

See also
 List of Billboard number-one alternative singles of the 2000s
 List of RPM number-one alternative rock singles

References

1999 songs
1999 singles
Music videos directed by Jonathan Dayton and Valerie Faris
Number-one singles in Iceland
Red Hot Chili Peppers songs
Song recordings produced by Rick Rubin
Songs about suicide
Commemoration songs
Songs written by Anthony Kiedis
Songs written by Chad Smith
Songs written by Flea (musician)
Songs written by John Frusciante